Emerson is an English surname derived from Anglo-Saxon Emars sunu, meaning "son of Emar" or "son of Ethelmar".  Another origin has been suggested as starting with the Old French epic hero Aimeri de Narbonne which passed into Italian as Amerigo and subsequently into English as Emery, Amery, and Imray, among others; Emerson is thought to derived as a patronymic from Emery.

Prominent people who share this surname have been listed below.

In literature
Alice B. Emerson, pseudonym of the authors of the Betty Gordon and Ruth Fielding children's novel series 
Claudia Emerson (1957–2014), American professor and Pulitzer Prize-winning poet
Earl Emerson (born 1948), American mystery novelist
Edward Waldo Emerson (1844–1930), son of Ralph Waldo, physician, writer and lecturer
George Barrell Emerson (1797–1881), American educator and pioneer of women's education rights
Gloria Emerson (1929-2004), American author, journalist and war correspondent.
Hunt Emerson (born 1952), English cartoonist and graphic novelist
Kathy Lynn Emerson, American writer of historical and mystery novels and non-fiction
Kevin Emerson, American author of young adult books
Mary Moody Emerson (1774–1863), American letter writer and diarist, teacher of her nephew Ralph Waldo Emerson
Nathaniel Bright Emerson (1839–1915), American physician and author of Hawaiian mythology
Ralph Waldo Emerson (1803–1882), American writer, philosopher, and transcendentalist
Sally Emerson, English novelist
Steven Emerson (born 1954), American print and broadcast investigative journalist
William Emerson (minister) (1769–1811), American philosopher, father of Ralph Waldo Emerson
Willis George Emerson (1856–1918) American novelist and author of The Smokey God

In business
Ernest Emerson (born 1955), American knifemaker and martial arts expert
Isaac Edward Emerson (1859–1931), American businessman, creator of the headache remedy Bromo-Seltzer
John Wesley Emerson (1832–1899), American lawyer, historian, Civil War officer, and founder of the Emerson Electric Company
Raymond Emerson (1886–1977), American civil engineer, investment banker, and faculty at the Peabody Museum of Archaeology and Ethnology
S. Thomas Emerson (also known as Tom Emerson; born 1941), American entrepreneur, angel investor and educator

In performing arts
Ashley Emerson (born 1984), American operatic soprano
August Emerson, American television, film and musical theatre actor
Avalon Emerson (born 1988), American electronic music producer and DJ
Billy "The Kid" Emerson (born 1929), African-American R&B musician
Darren Emerson (born 1971), British electronic musician
Donnie and Joe Emerson, American vocal and instrumental duo
Douglas Emerson (born 1974), American actor
Eric Emerson (1945–1975), American musician, dancer, and actor
Faye Emerson (1917–1983), American film actress and television personality
Frankie Emerson, American indie multi-instrumentalist, member of the rock band The Brian Jonestown Massacre
Hope Emerson (1897–1960), American film actress
Jacqueline Emerson (born 1994), American singer and actress
Keith Noel Emerson (1944–2016), English composer and musician, member of the band Emerson, Lake, and Palmer
Luther Orlando Emerson (1820–1915), American musician, composer and music publisher
Max Emerson (born 1988), American actor, model, author, director and YouTuber
Michael Emerson (born 1954), American stage and screen actor
Stuart Emerson, UK guitarist associated with his own band, Emerson, and Meat Loaf

In politics
Andrew L. Emerson, American politician, member of the Maine House of Representatives (1828–1829), first Mayor of Portland, Maine (1832)
Arthur Emerson, 21st Governor of American Samoa
Bill Emerson (1938–1996), aka Norvell William Emerson, American US congressman from Missouri
Clarence Emerson (1901–1963), Canadian merchant and politician, senator (1957–1963)
Craig Emerson (born 1954), Australian Labor Party representative from Queensland
David Emerson (born 1945), Canadian politician, businessman, civil servant
Frank Emerson (1882–1931), American politician, former governor of the US state of Wyoming
Hugh A. Emerson (1793–1860), lawyer and politician in Newfoundland, member of the Newfoundland House of Assembly (1837–1842)
James Emerson (1895–1917), British Army officer, posthumous recipient of the Victoria Cross
James A. Emerson (1865–1922), New York politician
Jo Ann Emerson (born 1950), American congresswoman from Missouri, and widow of former congressman Bill Emerson
John Emerson (mayor) (1859–1932), Canadian politician; former mayor of Calgary, Alberta
Julie Emerson (born 1988), American politician
Junius Emerson (1926–1992), American politician, member of the Pennsylvania House of Representatives (1965–1968, 1981–1982)
Lewis Edward Emerson (1890–1949), lawyer, judge and politician, first Chief Justice of Newfoundland and Labrador (1944–1949)
Louis W. Emerson (1857–1924), US congressman from New York
Newton Emerson (born c. 1970), Northern Irish political commentator and satirist
Peter Emerson (born 1943 or 1944), Northern Irish political activist
Prescott Emerson (1840–1889), lawyer and politician in Newfoundland, speaker of the Newfoundland and Labrador House of Assembly (1874–1878)
Rupert Emerson (1899–1979), American professor of political science and international relations
Herbert William Emerson (1881–1962), governor of Punjab, British India

In law

Thomas I. Emerson (1907-1991), American attorney, law professor, and First Amendment rights experts

In science and education
Alfred E. Emerson (1896–1976), American biologist
Barbara Emerson, English historian and biographer
Benjamin Kendall Emerson (1843–1932), American geologist and author
Beverly M. Emerson, American biochemist
Caryl Emerson, American literary critic, slavist and translator.
Charles Wesley Emerson (1837–1908), founder and first president of Emerson College 
E. Allen Emerson (born 1954), computer scientist
Ellen Russell Emerson (1837-1907), American ethnologist, author
Gladys Anderson Emerson (1903–1984), American historian, biochemist and nutritionist
John Haven Emerson (1906–1997), American inventor of biomedical devices
Oliver Farrar Emerson (1860–1927), American philologist and educator
Ralph Emerson (theologian) (1787–1863), Professor of Ecclesiastical History and Pastoral Theology in the Andover Theological Seminary
Ralph Emerson (botanist) (1912–1979), American botanist and mycologist
Rollins A. Emerson (1873–1947), American geneticist
Sharon Emerson (born 1945), American biologist
William Emerson (mathematician) (1701–1782), English eccentric, scientist and philosopher
William Henry Emerson (1860–1924), American chemist
William Keith Emerson (born 1928) American malacologist

In sport
Alan Emerson (born 1957), British motorcycle speedway rider
Antony Emerson (1963–2016), Australian tennis player
Chester Emerson (1889–1971), American Major League Baseball player for Philadelphia Athletics
David Emerson (born 1961), Australian cricketer
Denise Emerson (born 1960), Australian cricketer
Denny Emerson (Edward E. Emerson; born 1941), American equestrian
Eddie Emerson (1892–1970), Canadian football player
Gary Emerson (born 1963), English golfer and winner of the 2004 Russian Open
Hugh Emerson (born 1973), Irish Gaelic footballer
June Emerson (1924–1990), Canadian baseball player
Martin Emerson (born 2000), American football player
Nat Emerson (1874–1958), American tennis player
Nelson Emerson (born 1967), Canadian right wing hockey player formerly in the National Hockey League
Niamh Emerson (born 1999), English heptathlete
Norman Emerson (cricketer) (born 1939), Australian cricketer
Ox Emerson (Gover Conner Emerson; 1907–1998), American football player
Rob Emerson (born 1981), American mixed martial artist
Ross Emerson (born 1954), Australian international cricket umpire
Roy Emerson (born 1936), Australian tennis player
Scott Emerson (baseball) (born 1971), American baseball player, coach and pitching instructor

In visual arts
Arthur Webster Emerson, American/Hawaiian painter
Edith Emerson (1888–1981), American painter
Ken Emerson (1927–2010), Australian cartoonist and comic strip creator
Peter Henry Emerson (1856–1936), Cuban-born British photographer
Sarah Emerson, American artist 
William Ralph Emerson (1833–1917), Shingle-style American architect
William Otto Emerson (1856–1940), American painter and ornithologist

Fictional characters
Evelyn Emerson, character in the Amelia Peabody novel series by Elizabeth Peters
Nefret Emerson, character in the Amelia Peabody novel series by Elizabeth Peters
Radcliffe Emerson, character in the Amelia Peabody novel series by Elizabeth Peters
Michael Emerson, a character in The Lost Boys
Sam Emerson, a character in The Lost Boys
Lucy Emerson, a character in The Lost Boys

Other
Eben Emerson, American lighthouse keeper at Wood Island Light, Maine (1861–1865)
Ida Emerson, Broadway composer and lyricist
 Jimmy Coleman, better known as J. Paul Emerson (died 2001), American radio host
Jared Emerson-Johnson (born 1981), American video game music composer, sound designer, voice director and voice actor
Jodi Emerson (born 1972), anti-human trafficking advocate
Joseph Emerson (1821–1900), American minister and theologian
Lidian Jackson Emerson (1802–1892), second wife of Ralph Waldo Emerson
Mark T. Emerson, United States Navy rear admiral, commanded of the Naval Strike and Air Warfare Center (2006–2009)
Meredith Emerson, American murdered whilst hiking on Blood Mountain
Norman Emerson (1900–1966), Irish Anglican priest
Rick Emerson (also known as Rick Taylor; born 1973), American radio host
Ursula Newell Emerson (1806–1888), American missionary in the Hawaiian Islands, co-founder of the Waialua Protestant Church
Zelie Emerson (1883–1969), American suffragette in England

See also
Cherry Logan Emerson (disambiguation), various people
Edward Emerson (disambiguation), various people
George Emerson (disambiguation), various people
Henry Emerson (disambiguation), various people
John Emerson (disambiguation), various people
Robert Emerson (disambiguation), various people
Stephen Emerson (disambiguation), various people
Tom Emerson (disambiguation), various people
William Emerson (disambiguation), various people
Ambro Emerson (1983–2002), Canadian champion trotting horse
Emmerson (disambiguation)

References 

English-language surnames
Patronymic surnames